James G. "Jim" Millns Jr. (born January 13, 1949) is an American former competitive ice dancer. With partner Colleen O'Connor, he was the 1974–1976 U.S. national champion, the 1975 World silver medalist, the 1976 World bronze medalist, and the 1976 Olympic bronze medalist.

They were inducted into the United States Figure Skating Hall of Fame in 1993.

Competitive highlights
(with O'Connor)

See also
 World Fit

References

 
 
   

1949 births
American male ice dancers
Figure skaters at the 1976 Winter Olympics
Olympic bronze medalists for the United States in figure skating
Living people
Sportspeople from Toledo, Ohio
Olympic medalists in figure skating
World Figure Skating Championships medalists
Medalists at the 1976 Winter Olympics